Brant Kuithe is an American football tight end for the Utah Utes of the Pac-12 Conference.

Early life and high school
Kuithe grew up in Katy, Texas and attended Cinco Ranch High School, where played football and ran track. He was named the District 19-6A MVP after rushing for 1,041 yards and 18 touchdowns and punting 22 times for 881 yards despite only playing in seven games due to injury. Kuithe and his twin brother Blake both initially committed to play college football at Rice University, but de-committed after the firing of head coach David Bailiff. The brothers later signed to play at the University of Utah over offers from Colorado and Iowa State.

College career
In his freshman season Kuithe led Utah's tight ends with 20 receptions and 227 receiving yards with a touchdown reception. Kuithe led the Utes with 34 receptions, 602 receiving yards and 6 receiving touchdowns and also rushed six times for 102 yards and three touchdowns and was named second team All-Pac-12 Conference as a sophomore. As a junior, Kuithe led the Utes with 25 receptions for 236 yards in five games during the Pac-12's abbreviated season due to Covid-19 and was again named second team All-Conference.

After injuring his knee during the 24 Sept 2022 game against Arizona State, it was revealed on 26 Sept 2022 that he will miss the remainder of the 2022 season due to a torn ACL.

References

External links
Utah Utes bio

Living people
American football tight ends
People from Katy, Texas
Utah Utes football players
Players of American football from Texas
Sportspeople from Harris County, Texas
1999 births